Sarah Churchill, Duchess of Marlborough, Princess of Mindelheim, Countess of Nellenburg (née Jenyns, spelt Jennings in most modern references; 5 June 1660 (Old Style) – 18 October 1744), was an English courtier who rose to be one of the most influential women of her time through her close relationship with Anne, Queen of Great Britain. Churchill's relationship and influence with Princess Anne were widely known, and leading public figures often turned their attentions to her, hoping for favour from Anne. By the time Anne became queen, the Duchess of Marlborough's knowledge of government and intimacy with the Queen had made her a powerful friend and a dangerous enemy.

Churchill enjoyed a "long and devoted" relationship with her husband of more than 40 years, the great general John Churchill, 1st Duke of Marlborough. After Anne's father, King James II, was deposed during the Glorious Revolution, Sarah Churchill acted as Anne's agent, promoting her interests during the reigns of William III and Mary II. When Anne came to the throne after William's death in 1702, the Duke of Marlborough, together with Sidney Godolphin, 1st Earl of Godolphin, rose to head the government partly owing to his wife.

While the Duke of Marlborough was fighting the War of the Spanish Succession, the Duchess kept him informed of court intrigue and conveyed his requests and political advice to the Queen. The Duchess campaigned tirelessly on behalf of the Whigs, while also devoting herself to building projects such as Blenheim Palace. A strong-willed woman, she strained her relationship with the Queen whenever they disagreed on political, court, or church appointments. After her final break with Anne in 1711, the Duke and Duchess were dismissed from Court, but the Duchess had her revenge under the Hanoverian kings following Anne's death. She later had famous disagreements with many important people, including her daughter Henrietta Godolphin, 2nd Duchess of Marlborough; the architect of Blenheim Palace, John Vanbrugh; Prime Minister Robert Walpole; King George II; and his wife, Queen Caroline. The money she inherited from the Marlborough trust left her one of the richest women in Europe. She died in 1744, aged 84.

Early life 
Sarah Jennings was born on 5 June 1660, probably at Holywell House, St Albans, Hertfordshire. She was the daughter of Richard Jennings (or Jenyns), a Member of Parliament, and Frances Thornhurst. Her paternal grandfather was Sir John Jennings, father of an extraordinarily large family by his wife Alice Spencer. Her uncle Martin Lister was a prominent naturalist. 

Richard Jennings came into contact with James, Duke of York (the future James II, brother of King Charles II), in 1663, during negotiations for the recovery of an estate in Kent (Agney Court) that had been the property of his mother-in-law, Susan Lister (née Temple). James's first impressions were favourable, and in 1664 Sarah's sister, Frances, was appointed maid of honour to the Duchess of York, Anne Hyde.

Although James forced Frances to give up the post because of her marriage to a Catholic, James did not forget the family. In 1673, Sarah entered court as maid of honour to James's second wife, Mary of Modena.

Sarah Jennings became close to the young Princess Anne in about 1675, and the friendship grew stronger as the two grew older. In late 1675, when she was still only fifteen, she met John Churchill, 10 years her senior, who fell in love with her. Churchill, who had previously been a lover of Charles II's mistress Barbara Palmer, 1st Duchess of Cleveland, had little to offer financially, as his estates were deeply in debt. Jennings had a rival for Churchill in Catherine Sedley, a wealthy mistress of James II and the choice of Churchill's father, Sir Winston Churchill, who was anxious to restore the family's fortune. John Churchill may have hoped to take Jennings as a mistress in place of the Duchess of Cleveland, who had recently departed for France, but surviving letters from Jennings to Churchill show her unwillingness to assume that role.

Marriage 

In 1677, Jennings's brother Ralph died, and she and her sister Frances became co-heirs of the family estates in Hertfordshire and Kent. Churchill chose Sarah Jennings over Catherine Sedley, but both Churchill's and Jennings's families disapproved of the match, and therefore they married secretly in the winter of 1677–78.

John and Sarah Churchill were both Protestants in a predominantly Catholic court, a circumstance that would complicate their political allegiances. Although no date was recorded, the marriage was announced only to the Duchess of York and a small circle of friends, so that Sarah could keep her court position as Maid of Honour.

When Churchill became pregnant, her marriage was announced publicly (on 1 October 1678), and she retired from the court to give birth to her first child, Harriet, who died in infancy. When the Duke of York went into self-imposed exile to Scotland as a result of the furore surrounding the Popish Plot, John and Sarah accompanied him, and Charles II rewarded John's loyalty by creating him Baron Churchill of Eyemouth in Scotland. As a result, Sarah became Lady Churchill. The Duke of York returned to England after the religious tension had eased, and Sarah was appointed a Lady of the Bedchamber to Anne after the latter's marriage in 1683.

Reign of James II (1685–1688) 
The early reign of James II was relatively successful; it was not expected that a Catholic king could assert control in a fiercely Protestant, anti-Catholic country. In addition, his daughter and heir was a Protestant. However, when James attempted to reform the national religion, popular discontent against him and his government became widespread. The level of alarm increased when Queen Mary gave birth to a Roman Catholic son and heir, Prince James Francis Edward, on 10 June 1688. A group of politicians known as the Immortal Seven invited Prince William of Orange, husband of James's Protestant daughter Mary, to invade England and remove James from power, a plan that became public knowledge very quickly. James still retained some influence, and he ordered that both Lady Churchill and Princess Anne be placed under house arrest at Anne's residence (the Cockpit) in the Palace of Whitehall. Both their husbands, though previously loyal to James, had switched their allegiances to William of Orange. In her memoirs, Lady Churchill described how the two easily escaped captivity and fled to Nottingham:

Although Churchill implied that she had encouraged the escape for the safety of Princess Anne, it is more likely that she was protecting herself and her husband. If James had succeeded in defeating Prince William of Orange in battle, he might have imprisoned and even executed Lord and Lady Churchill for treason, whereas it was unlikely he would have condemned his daughter to a similar fate. But James fled to France in December 1688 rather than confront the invading army, allowing William to take over his throne.

William III and Mary II 
Life for Churchill during the reign of William and Mary was difficult. William and Mary awarded Churchill's husband the title Earl of Marlborough, but the new earl and countess enjoyed considerably less favour than they had during the reign of James II. The Earl of Marlborough had supported the now exiled James, and by this time, the Countess's influence on Anne, and her cultivation of high members of the government to promote Anne's interests, was widely known. Mary II responded to this by demanding that Anne dismiss Lady Marlborough. However, Anne refused. This created a rift between Mary and Anne that never healed.

Other problems also emerged. In 1689, Anne's supporters (including the Marlboroughs and the Duke of Somerset) demanded that she be granted a parliamentary annuity of £50,000, a sum that would end her dependence on William and Mary. The Countess of Marlborough was seen as the driving force behind this bill, creating further ill-feeling towards her at court. William responded to the demand by offering the same sum from the Privy Purse to keep Anne dependent on his generosity. However, Anne, through the Countess of Marlborough, refused, pointing out that a parliamentary grant would be more secure than charity from the Privy Purse. Eventually Anne received the grant from Parliament and felt she owed this to the Countess's efforts.

The Countess's success as a leader of the opposition only intensified Queen Mary's animosity towards the Marlboroughs. Although she could not dismiss the Countess of Marlborough from Anne's service, Mary responded by evicting the Countess from her court lodgings at the Palace of Whitehall. Anne responded by leaving the court as well, and she and the Countess went to stay with their friends the Duke and Duchess of Somerset at Syon House. Anne continued to defy Mary's demand for the Countess's dismissal, even though an incriminating document signed by the Earl of Marlborough supporting the recently exiled James II and his supporters had been discovered. This document is likely to have been forged by Robert Young, a known forger and disciple of Titus Oates; Oates was famous for stirring a strongly anti-Catholic atmosphere in England between 1679 and the early 1680s. The Earl was imprisoned in the Tower of London. The loneliness the Countess suffered during these events drew her and Anne closer together.

Following the death of Mary II from smallpox in 1694, William III restored Anne's honours, as she was now next in line to the throne, and provided her with apartments at St. James's Palace. He also restored the Earl of Marlborough to all his offices and honours and exonerated him from any past accusations. However, fearing the Countess's powerful influence, William kept Anne out of government affairs, and he did not make her regent in his absences though she was now his heir apparent.

Power behind the throne: Queen Anne 

In 1702, William III died, and Anne became queen. Anne immediately offered John Churchill a dukedom, which Sarah initially refused. Sarah was concerned that a dukedom would strain the family's finances; a ducal family at the time was expected to show off its rank through lavish entertainments. Anne countered by offering the Marlboroughs a pension of £5,000 a year for life from Parliament, as well as an extra £2,000 a year from the Privy Purse, and they accepted the dukedom. The Duchess of Marlborough was promptly created Mistress of the Robes (the highest office in the royal court that could be held by a woman), Groom of the Stool, Keeper of the Privy Purse, and Ranger of Windsor Great Park. She was the first of only two women ever to be Keeper of the Privy Purse and the only woman ever to be Ranger of Windsor Great Park. As Keeper of the Privy Purse, she was replaced by the only other woman to hold the position: her cousin and rival Abigail Masham, Baroness Masham. The Duke accepted the Order of the Garter as well as the office of Captain-General of the army.

During much of Anne's reign, the Duke of Marlborough was abroad fighting the War of the Spanish Succession, while the Duchess remained in England. Despite being the most powerful woman in England besides the Queen, she appeared at court only rarely, preferring to oversee the construction of her new estate, Woodstock Manor (the site of the later Blenheim Palace), a gift from Queen Anne after the Duke's victory at the Battle of Blenheim. Nevertheless, Anne sent her news of political developments in letters and consulted the Duchess's advice in most matters.

The Duchess was famous for telling the Queen exactly what she thought, and did not offer her flattery. The two women had invented pet names for themselves during their youth which they continued to use after Anne became queen: Mrs Freeman (Sarah) and Mrs Morley (Anne). Effectively a business manager, the Duchess had control over the Queen's position, from her finances to people admitted to the royal presence.

Wavering influence 

Anne, however, expected kindness and compassion from her closest friend. The Duchess was not forthcoming in this regard and frequently overpowered and dominated Anne. One major political disagreement occurred when the Duchess insisted that her son-in-law Charles Spencer, 3rd Earl of Sunderland, be admitted into the Privy Council. The Duchess allied herself more strongly with the Whigs, who supported the Duke of Marlborough in the war, and the Whigs hoped to utilise the Duchess's position as royal favourite.

Anne refused to appoint Sunderland. She disliked the radical Whigs, whom she saw as a threat to her royal prerogative. The Duchess used her close friendship with Sidney Godolphin, 1st Earl of Godolphin, whom Anne trusted, to eventually secure such appointments, but continued to lobby Anne herself. She sent Whig reading materials to Anne in an attempt to win her over to her own preferred political party. In 1704, Anne confided to Lord Godolphin that she did not think she and the Duchess of Marlborough could ever be true friends again.

Clash of personalities 

The Duchess's frankness and indifference for rank, so admired by Anne earlier in their friendship, was now seen to be intrusive. The Duchess had a powerful intimacy with the two most powerful men in the country, the Duke of Marlborough (her husband) and the Earl of Godolphin. Godolphin, though a great friend of the Duchess, had considered refusing high office after Anne's accession, preferring to live quietly and away from the Duchess of Marlborough's political side. The Earl considered the Duchess (as a powerful and intelligent woman) bossy, interfering, and presuming to tell him what to do when the Duke was away.

The Duchess, although a woman in a man's world of national and international politics, was always ready to give her advice, express her opinions, antagonize with outspoken censure, and insist on having her say on every possible occasion. However, she had a charm and vivaciousness admired by many, and she could easily delight those she met with her wit.

Anne's apparent withdrawal of genuine affection occurred for a number of reasons. She was frustrated by the Duchess of Marlborough's long absences from court and despite numerous letters from Anne to the Duchess on this subject, the Duchess rarely attended. There was also a political difference between them: the Queen was a Tory (the party known as the "Church party", religion being one of Anne's chief concerns), and the Duchess was a Whig (the party known to support Marlborough's wars).

The Duchess did not share Anne's deep interest in religion, a subject she rarely mentioned, although at their last fraught interview she did warn Anne that she risked God's vengeance for her unreasoning cruelty to the Duchess. The Queen did not want this difference to come between them, but the Duchess, always thinking of her husband, wanted Anne to give more support to the Whigs, which she was not prepared to do.

The Duchess of Marlborough was called to Cambridge in 1703, where her only surviving son, John, Marquess of Blandford, was taken ill with smallpox. The Duke was recalled from the war and was at his bedside when he died on 20 February 1703. The Duchess was heartbroken over the loss of her son and became reclusive for a period, expressing her grief by closing herself off from Anne and either not answering her letters or doing so in a cold and formal manner. However, the Duchess did not allow Anne to shut her out when Anne suffered bereavement.

After the death of Anne's husband, Prince George of Denmark, in 1708, the Duchess arrived, uninvited, at Kensington Palace to find Anne with the prince's body. She pressed the heartbroken Queen to move from Kensington to St James's Palace in London, which Anne bluntly refused, and instead commanded the Duchess to call Abigail Masham to attend her. Aware that Masham was gaining more influence with Anne, the Duchess disobeyed the Queen, and instead scolded her for grieving over Prince George's death. Although Anne eventually submitted and allowed herself to be taken to St James's Palace, the Duchess's insensitivity greatly offended her and added to the already significant strain on the relationship.

Fall from grace

Abigail Masham: political rival 
The Duchess of Marlborough had previously introduced her impoverished cousin, then known as Abigail Hill, to court, with the intention of finding a role for her. Abigail, the eldest daughter of the Duchess's aunt, Elizabeth Hill (Jennings), was working as a servant to Sir John Rivers of Kent when the Duchess first learned of her existence. Because the Duchess's grandfather Sir John Jennings had fathered twenty-two children, she had a multitude of cousins and did not know them all. Out of kindness and a sense of family solidarity, she gave Abigail Hill employment within her own household at St Albans, and after a tenure of satisfactory service, Hill was made a Lady of the Bedchamber to Queen Anne in 1704. The Duchess later claimed in her memoirs that she had raised Hill "in all regards as a sister", though there were implications that she only assisted her cousin out of embarrassment of her difficult circumstances.

Hill was also a second cousin, on her father's side, to the Tory leader Robert Harley, later first Earl of Oxford and Mortimer. Flattering, subtle and retiring, Hill was the complete opposite of the Duchess of Marlborough, who was dominating, blunt and scathing. During the Duchess's frequent absences from court, Hill and Anne grew close. Not only was Hill happy to give the Queen the kindness and compassion that Anne had longed for from the Duchess, she also never pressured the Queen about politics. Anne responded with pathos to Hill's flattery and charm. She was present at Hill's secret wedding, in 1707, to Samuel Masham, groom of the bedchamber to Prince George, without the Duchess's knowledge.

The Duchess was completely oblivious to any friendship between Anne and Abigail Masham and was therefore surprised when she discovered that Abigail frequently saw the Queen in private. The Duchess found out about Masham's marriage several months after it had occurred and immediately went to see Anne with the intention of informing her of the event. It was at that interview that Anne let slip that she had begged Masham to tell the Duchess of the marriage, and the Duchess became suspicious about what had really happened. After questioning servants and the Royal Household for a week about Masham's marriage, the Duchess discovered that the Queen had been present and had given Abigail a dowry of £2,000 from the Privy Purse. That proved to the Duchess that Anne was duplicitous. Despite being Keeper of the Privy Purse, the Duchess had been unaware of any such payment.

Strained relationship 

In July 1708, the Duke of Marlborough and his ally Prince Eugene of Savoy won a great victory at the Battle of Oudenarde. On the way to the thanksgiving service at St Paul's Cathedral, the Duchess of Marlborough engaged in a furious argument with the Queen about the jewels Anne wore to the service, and showed her a letter from the Duke which expressed hope that the Queen would make good political use of the victory. The implication that she should publicly express her support for the Whigs offended Anne; at the service the Duchess told the Queen to "be quiet" after Anne continued the argument, thus offending the Queen still further.

Anne's next letter to the Duchess was an exercise in chilling hostility, referring sarcastically to the "command" the Duchess had given her to be silent. As a result the Duchess, who rarely admitted that she was in the wrong, for once realised that she had gone too far and apologised for her rudeness, but her apology had little effect. Anne wrote to the Duke of Marlborough, encouraging him not to let her rift with the Duchess become public knowledge, but he could not prevent his wife's indiscretion.

The Duchess continued vehemently supporting the Whigs in writing and speaking to Anne, with the support of Godolphin and the other Whig ministers. The news of the public's support for the Whigs reached the Duke in letters from the Duchess and Godolphin, which influenced the Duke's political advice to the Queen. Anne, already in ill health, felt used and harassed and was desperate for escape. She found refuge in the gentle and quiet comfort of Abigail Masham.

Anne had explained before that she did not wish the public to know that her relationship with the Duchess of Marlborough was failing, because any sign that the Duchess was out of favour would have a damaging impact on the Duke's authority as captain-general. The Duchess was kept in all of her offices – purely for the sake of her husband's position as Captain-General of the army – and the tension between the two women lingered until early in 1711. This year was to see the end of their relationship for good.

The Duchess had always been jealous of Anne's affection for Abigail Masham after she learned of it. With the Duke of Marlborough and most of the Whig party, she had tried to force Anne to dismiss Masham. All these attempts failed, even when Anne was threatened with an official parliamentary demand from the Whigs, who were suspicious of Masham's Tory influence with Anne. The whole scenario echoed Anne's refusal to give up Sarah Churchill during the reign of William and Mary, but the threat of parliamentary interference exceeded anything tried against Anne in the 1690s.

Anne was ultimately triumphant; she conducted interviews with high-ranking politicians of both political parties and begged them "with tears in her eyes" to oppose the motion. The general view was that the Marlboroughs had made themselves look ridiculous over a trivial matter – since when, it was asked, did Parliament address the Queen on whom she should employ in her bedchamber?

The passion Anne showed for Masham, and the Queen's stubborn refusal to dismiss her, angered the Duchess to the point that she implied that a lesbian affair was taking place between the two women. During the mourning period for Anne's husband, the Duchess was the only one who refused to wear suitable mourning clothes. This gave the impression that she did not consider Anne's grief over his death to be genuine. Eventually, because of the mass support for peace in the War of the Spanish Succession, Anne decided she no longer needed the Duke of Marlborough and took the opportunity to dismiss him on trumped-up charges of embezzlement.

Final dismissal 

The Duchess's last attempt to re-establish her friendship with Anne came in 1710 when they had their final meeting. An account written by the Duchess shortly afterwards shows that she pleaded to be given an explanation of why their friendship was at an end, but Anne was unmoved, coldly repeating a few set phrases such as  "I shall make no answer to anything you say" and "you may put it in writing".

The Duchess was so appalled by the Queen's "inhuman" conduct that she was reduced to tears, and most unusually for a woman who rarely spoke of religion, ended by threatening the Queen with the judgment of God. Anne replied that God's judgment on her concerned herself only, but later admitted that this was the one remark from the Duchess that hurt her deeply.

After hearing this, the Duke of Marlborough, realising that Anne intended to dismiss him and his wife, begged the Queen to keep them in their offices for nine months until the campaign was over, so that they could retire honourably. However, Anne told the Duke that "for her [Anne's] honour" the Duchess was to resign immediately and return her gold key – the symbol of her authority within the royal household – within two days. Years of trying the Queen's patience finally had resulted in her dismissal. When told the news, the Duchess, in a fit of pride, told the Duke to return the key to the Queen immediately.

In January 1711, the Duchess of Marlborough lost the offices of Mistress of the Robes and Groom of the Stole and was replaced by Elizabeth Seymour, Duchess of Somerset. Abigail Masham was made Keeper of the Privy Purse. This broke a promise Anne had made to distribute these court offices to the Duchess of Marlborough's children.

The Marlboroughs also lost state funding for Blenheim Palace, and the building came to a halt for the first time since it was begun in 1705. Now in disgrace, they left England and travelled in Europe. As a result of his success in the War of the Spanish Succession, the Duke of Marlborough was a favourite among the German courts and with the Holy Roman Empire, and the family was received in those places with full honours.

The Duchess, however, did not like being away from England and often complained that  she and the Duke were received with full honours in Europe, but were in disgrace at home. The Duchess found life travelling the royal courts difficult, remarking that they were full of dull company. She took the waters at Aachen in Germany on account of her ill health, corresponded with those in England who could supply her with political gossip, and indulged in her fascination with Catholicism.

Revival of favour 

The Duchess and Queen Anne never made up their differences, although one eyewitness claimed to have heard Anne asking whether the Marlboroughs had reached the shore, leading to rumours that she had called them home herself. Anne died on 1 August 1714 at Kensington Palace; the Protestant Whig Privy Councillors had insisted on their right to be present, preventing Henry St. John, 1st Viscount Bolingbroke, from declaring for the Pretender, James Francis Edward Stuart.

The Marlboroughs returned home on the afternoon of Anne's death. The Act of Settlement 1701 ensured a Protestant succession by passing over more than 50 stronger Catholic claimants and proclaiming Georg Ludwig, Elector of Hanover (the great-grandson of James I through Georg's mother Sophia of Hanover), King George I of Great Britain.

The new reign was supported by the Whigs, who were mostly staunch Protestants. The Tories were suspected of supporting the Pretender, a Roman Catholic. George I rewarded the Whigs by forming a Whig government; at his welcome in Queen's House at Greenwich, he conversed with the Whigs but not with the Tories. The Duchess of Marlborough approved of his choice of Whig ministers.

King George also had a personal friendship with the Marlboroughs; the Duke had fought with him in the War of the Spanish Succession, and John and Sarah made frequent visits to the Hanoverian court during their effective exile from England. George's first words to the Duke as king of Great Britain were, "My lord Duke, I hope your troubles are now over." Marlborough was restored to his old office of Captain-General of the Army.

The Duchess was relieved to move back to England. The Duke became one of the King's close advisers, and the Duchess moved back into Marlborough House, where she flaunted her eldest granddaughter, Lady Henrietta Godolphin, in the hope of finding her a suitable marriage partner. Henrietta eventually married Thomas Pelham-Holles, 1st Duke of Newcastle-upon-Tyne, in April 1717, and the rest of the Marlboroughs' grandchildren made successful marriages.

The Duchess of Marlborough's concern for her grandchildren briefly came to a halt when in 1716 her husband had two strokes, the second of which left him without the ability to speak. The Duchess spent much of her time with him, accompanying him to Tunbridge Wells and Bath, and he recovered shortly afterwards. Even after his recovery, the Duchess opened his correspondence and filtered the letters the Duke received, lest their contents precipitate another stroke.

The Duchess had a good relationship with her daughter Anne Spencer, Countess of Sunderland, whereas she later became estranged from her daughters Henrietta, Elizabeth and Mary. Heartbroken when Anne died in 1716, the Duchess kept her favourite cup and a lock of her hair and adopted the Sunderlands' youngest child, Lady Diana, who later became her favourite granddaughter.

Later years 

The Duke of Marlborough died at Windsor in 1722, and the Duchess arranged a large funeral for him. Their daughter Henrietta became duchess in her own right. The Dowager Duchess became one of the trustees of the Marlborough estate, and she used her business sense to distribute the family fortune, including the income for her daughter Henrietta.

The Dowager Duchess's personal income was now considerable, and she used the money to invest in land; she believed this would protect her from currency devaluation. She purchased Wimbledon manor in 1723, and rebuilt the manor house. Her wealth was so considerable that she hoped to marry her granddaughter Lady Diana Spencer to Frederick, Prince of Wales, for which she would pay a massive dowry of £100,000.

However, Robert Walpole, First Lord of the Treasury (analogous to a modern Prime Minister), vetoed the plan. Walpole, although a Whig, had alienated the Dowager Duchess by supporting peace in Europe; she was also suspicious of his financial probity and Walpole, in turn, mistrusted the Dowager Duchess. Despite this, good relations with the royal family continued and the Dowager Duchess was occasionally invited to court by Queen Caroline, who attempted to cultivate her friendship.

Sarah Churchill was a capable business manager, unusual in a period when women were excluded from most things outside the management of their household. Her friend Arthur Maynwaring wrote that she was more capable of business than any man. Although she never came to like Blenheim Palace – describing it as "that great heap of stones" – she became more enthusiastic about its construction and wrote to the Duke of Somerset about the new waterworks: "I believe it will be beautiful. The Canal and Bason (which is already don[e]) look very fine. There is to be a lake & a cascade ... which I think will bee a great addition to the place".

The Duchess of Marlborough fought against anything she thought was extravagant. She wrote to the Duke of Somerset, "I have reduced the stables to one-third of what was intended by Sir John [Vanbrugh] yet I have room for  fine horses".

The Duchess allowed only two features of extravagance: the Marlboroughs' tomb in the Blenheim chapel, designed by William Kent and the Doric Column of Victory in the park designed by Henry Herbert, 9th Earl of Pembroke, and finished by Roger Morris. The Duchess carefully monitored the construction of all Blenheim's features and she fell out with anyone who did not do exactly what she wanted.

These detailed inspections extended to the Duchess's smaller land purchases. After buying the Wimbledon estate (which she described as "upon clay, an ill sod, very damp and...an unhealthy place") and Holdenby House near Althorp, she kept detailed accounts of her finances and expenditure, as well as a sharp look-out for any dishonesty in her agents.

The Dowager Duchess's friendship with Queen Caroline ended when she refused the Queen access through her Wimbledon estate, which resulted in the loss of her £500 income as Ranger of Windsor Great Park. The Dowager Duchess was also rude to King George II – making it clear that he was "too much of a German" – which further alienated her from the court. Her persona non-grata status at the Walpole-controlled court prevented her from suppressing the rise of the Tories; Walpole's taxes and peace with Spain were deeply unpopular with ruling class English society, and the Tories were gaining much more support as a result.

The Dowager Duchess never lost her good looks and, despite failing popularity, received many offers of marriage after the death of her husband, including one from her old enemy, the Duke of Somerset. Ultimately, she decided against remarriage, preferring to keep her independence. The Dowager Duchess continued to appeal against court decisions which ruled that funding for Blenheim should come from the Marlboroughs' personal estate, and not the government. This made her unpopular; as a trustee of her family's estate, she could easily have afforded the payments herself. She was surprised by the grief she felt following the death of her eldest living daughter, Henrietta, in 1733. The Dowager Duchess lived to see her enemy Robert Walpole fall in 1742, and in the same year attempted to improve her reputation by approving a biographical publication titled An Account of the Dowager Duchess of Marlborough from her first coming to Court to the year 1710. She died at the age of 84, on 18 October 1744, at Marlborough House; she was buried at Blenheim. Her husband's body was exhumed from Westminster Abbey and buried beside her.

Assessment 

Although the Duchess of Marlborough's downfall is chiefly attributed to her own self-serving relationship with Queen Anne, she was a vibrant and intelligent woman who promoted Anne's interests when she was princess. However, she found Anne a dull conversationalist and the Duchess did not find her company stimulating.

The Duchess believed that she had a right to enforce her political advice, whether Anne personally liked it or not, and became angry if the Queen stubbornly refused to take it. She seems to have underestimated Anne's strength of character, continuing to believe she could dominate a woman whom foreign ambassadors noted had become "very determined and quite ferocious". Apart from her notorious bad temper, the Duchess's main weakness has been described as "an almost pathological inability to admit the validity of anyone else's point of view".

Abigail Masham also played a key role in the Duchess's downfall. Modest and retiring, she promoted the Tory policies of her cousin Robert Harley. Despite Masham's owing her position at court to the Duchess of Marlborough, the Duchess soon saw Masham as her enemy who supplanted her in Anne's affections when the Duchess spent more and more time away from the Queen.

During her lifetime, the Duchess of Marlborough drafted 26 wills, the last of which was only written a few months before her death, and purchased 27 estates. With a wealth of over £4 million in land, £17,000 in rent rolls, and a further £12,500 in annuities, she made financial bequests to rising Whig ministers such as William Pitt, later the first Earl of Chatham, and Philip Stanhope, 4th Earl of Chesterfield. Although she left little to the poor and even less to charity, she left her servants' annuities far above the average for the time; her favourite, Grace Ridley, received £16,000, equivalent to approximately £1.32 million in today's money.

Much of the money left after the Duchess's numerous bequests was inherited by her grandson John Spencer, with the condition that he could not accept a political office under the government. He also inherited the remainder of the Duchess's numerous estates, including Wimbledon. Marlborough House remained empty for 14 years, with the exception of James Stephens, one of her executors, before it became the property of the Dukes of Marlborough upon Stephens's death.

In 1817, Marlborough House became a royal residence, and passed through members of the British royal family until it became the Commonwealth Secretariat in 1959. Wimbledon Park House succumbed to fire in 1785, and Holywell House, the Duchess of Marlborough's birthplace in St Albans, was demolished in 1827. Today, much of St Albans is named after the Marlboroughs because of the Duchess's influence.

The Duchess died, in the words of Tobias Smollett, "immensely rich and very little regretted, either by her own family or the world in general", but her efforts to continue the Marlborough legacy cannot be ignored. Because of her influence, the Duchess managed to marry off members of her family to England's greatest aristocratic dynasties.

Children 
The Duke and Duchess of Marlborough's children who survived childhood married into the most important families in Great Britain:

In popular culture

In her own time, Sarah Churchill was satirised by many well-known writers in the period, such as Delarivier Manley in her influential political satire, The New Atalantis (1709), and also by Charles Gildon in the first fully-fledged it-narrative in English, The Golden Spy; or, A Political Journal of the British Nights Entertainments (1709), to name just a few.

Churchill is portrayed by actress Rachel Weisz in the 2018 film The Favourite, which centres on the competition between the Duchess and Lady Masham (Emma Stone) for the affections of Queen Anne (Olivia Colman). Weisz won the BAFTA Award for Best Actress in a Supporting Role and was nominated for the Academy Award for Best Supporting Actress for her portrayal.

Churchill was played by Romola Garai in the Royal Shakespeare Company West End production of Helen Edmundson's  Queen Anne at the Theatre Royal Haymarket in 2017.

Churchill was played by Susannah York in the 1983 comedy Yellowbeard.

Churchill was played by Alla Demidova in the 1979 Soviet movie A Glass of Water, based on the French play The Glass of Water: or, Effects and Causes (French: Le verre d’eau ou Les effets et les causes) (1840) by Eugène Scribe.

Churchill was played by Susan Hampshire in the 1969 BBC mini-series The First Churchills.

References

Notes

Citations

Bibliography

 
 Churchill, Sir Winston. Marlborough: His Life and Times. 2 vols. Chicago: University of Chicago Press, 2002.

 Field, Ophelia. The Favourite: Sarah, Duchess of Marlborough. London: Hodder and Stoughton, 2002.

 

 Harris, Frances. A Passion For Government: The Life of Sarah, Duchess of Marlborough. Oxford: Clarendon Press, 1991.

 Harris, Tim. Revolution: The Great Crisis of the British Monarchy, 1685–1720, Penguin Books, Ltd., 2006. .

 Hibbert, Christopher. The Marlboroughs: John and Sarah Churchill (1650–1744). London: Viking Press, 2001.
 
 Miller, John. James II (3rd ed. 2000) .
Murdoch, Tessa, ed. Noble Households: Eighteenth-Century Inventories of Great English Houses (Cambridge, John Adamson, 2006)  . For inventories of Blenheim Palace and Marlborough House, taken for the duchess in 1740, see pp. 275–83 and 284–7.
 Murray, Hon. Sir George, ed. The Letters and Dispatches of John Churchill, First Duke of Marlborough, from 1702–1712. 5 vols. New York: Greenwood Press, 1968.
 Pointon, Marcia, "Material Manoeuvres: Sarah Churchill, Duchess of Marlborough and the Power of Artefacts," Art History, 32,3 (2009), 485–515.
 Reid, Stuart. John and Sarah, Duke and Duchess of Marlborough 1914 edition
 Rowse, A. L. The Early Churchills Penguin, 1956

External links 

 Berkshire History biography about Sarah Churchill, Duchess of Marlborough
 Encyclopædia Britannica "additional reading" article about Sarah Churchill, Duchess of Marlborough
 

1660 births
1744 deaths
18th-century English people
17th-century English women
17th-century English people
18th-century British women writers
18th-century British writers
British and English royal favourites
English duchesses by marriage
English letter writers
Women letter writers
British maids of honour
Mistresses of the Robes to Anne, Queen of Great Britain
German countesses
German princesses
People from St Albans
People from Old Windsor
People from Woodstock, Oxfordshire
Sarah Churchill, Duchess of Marlborough
Grooms of the Stool
Wives of knights